Anthony James Frew FRCP (April 1955 – 28 November 2018) was professor of allergy and respiratory medicine at the Royal Sussex County Hospital.

Early life
Frew grew up in Essex. His father was a GP. He was educated at a prep school near Ashdown Forest and won a scholarship to Westminster School. He studied medicine at Cambridge and trained in respiratory medicine.

Career
Frew was a high-profile member of the acute medical, respiratory and allergy teams at the Royal Sussex County Hospital which he joined in 2005.

Frew died in Brighton in November 2018.

Personal life
Frew was married to Helen Smith and had four children. He loved travelling and classical music.

References 

1955 births
2018 deaths
Fellows of the Royal College of Physicians
British pulmonologists